4-HO-McPT (4-hydroxy-N-methyl-N-cyclopropyltryptamine) is a psychedelic tryptamine derivative. It has serotonergic effects, and has reportedly been sold as a designer drug since around 2016, but was not definitively identified by forensic laboratories until 2018. It is illegal in Finland.

See also
 4-HO-EPT
 4-HO-MALT
 4-HO-McPeT
 4-HO-MiPT
 5-MeO-MALT

References

Phenols
Psychedelic tryptamines
Designer drugs